L98 may refer to:

 L98 Cadet Rifles
 Luna (Orca), an animal whose official name is L98
 A variant of the GM small-block engine used in Holden cars